The 71st annual Berlin International Film Festival took place from 1 to 5 March 2021 as a virtual festival due to the COVID-19 pandemic. An in-person event has also been tentatively scheduled for June, pending the resolution of the COVID-19 issue.

The Romanian film Bad Luck Banging or Loony Porn directed by Radu Jude won the Golden Bear. It was the third victory of Romania in the last nine years.

Jury

Competition
The following were on the jury for the Berlinale Competition section:

 Ildikó Enyedi, film director and screenwriter (Hungary) 
 Nadav Lapid, film director and screenwriter (Israel)
 Adina Pintilie, film director and screenwriter (Romania)
 Mohammad Rasoulof, film director and screenwriter (Iran)
 Gianfranco Rosi, documentary filmmaker (Italy)
 Jasmila Žbanić, film director and screenwriter (Bosnia and Herzegovina)

Encounters
The following people were on the jury for the Encounters Awards:

 Florence Almozini, programmer (France)
 Cecilia Barrionuevo, artistic director (Argentina)
 Diedrich Diederichsen, editor and publisher (Germany)

International Short Film
The following people were on the jury for the Berlinale Shorts section:

 Basim Magdy, artist (Egypt)
 Christine A. Maier, cinematographer (Austria)
 Sebastian Urzendowsky, actor (Germany)

Competition
The following films were selected for the main competition for the Golden Bear and Silver Bear awards:

Berlinale Special

Encounters
The following films were selected for the Encounters section:

Panorama
The following films were selected for the Panorama section:

Perspektive Deutsches Kino
The following films were selected for the Perspektive Deutsches Kino section:

Awards

Official awards

Competition
 Golden Bear: Bad Luck Banging or Loony Porn by Radu Jude
 Silver Bear Grand Jury Prize: Wheel of Fortune and Fantasy by Ryusuke Hamaguchi
 Silver Bear Jury Prize: Mr. Bachmann and His Class by Maria Speth
 Silver Bear for Best Director: Dénes Nagy for Natural Light
 Silver Bear for Best Leading Performance: Maren Eggert for I'm Your Man
 Silver Bear for Best Supporting Performance: Lilla Kizlinger for Forest - I See You Everywhere
 Silver Bear for Best Screenplay: Hong Sang-soo for Introduction
 Silver Bear for Outstanding Artistic Contribution: Yibrán Asuad for editing in A Cop Movie

 Encounters
 Best Film: We by Alice Diop
 Special Jury Award: Taste by Lê Bảo
 Best Director (ex-aequo):
 Ramon Zürcher and Silvan Zürcher	 for The Girl and the Spider
 Denis Côté for Social Hygiene
 Special Mention: Rock Bottom Riser by Fern Silva

International Short Film
 Golden Bear for Best Short Film: My Uncle Tudor by Olga Lucovnicova
 Silver Bear Jury Prize: Day Is Gone by Zhang Dalei
 Berlin Short Film Candidate for the European Film Awards: Easter Eggs by Nicolas Keppens

Generation
 Kplus competition
 Grand Prix: Summer Blur by Han Shuai
 Special Mention: A School in Cerro Hueso by Betania Cappato
 14plus competition
 Grand Prix: The Fam by Fred Baillif
 Special Mention: Cryptozoo'' by Dash Shaw

References

External links
Berlin International Film Festival

71
2021 film festivals
2021 in Berlin
2021 festivals in Europe
2021 in German cinema